United Nations Security Council resolution 556, adopted on 23 October 1984, after recalling 554 (1984) and the Universal Declaration of Human Rights, the Council expressed its alarm at the killing of anti-apartheid demonstrators in South Africa, reaffirming that the country's disregard for world opinion will lead to a further escalation of the "explosive situation".

The Council reiterated its opposition to apartheid, demanding the immediate cessation of massacres in South Africa and the release of all political prisoners. It also called on all Member States and international organisations to assist the South African people in their "legitimate struggle for the full exercise of the right to self-determination".

Finally, Resolution 556 called for the dismantling of the bantustans, the removal of bans on anti-apartheid parties, individuals and news media, and requested the Secretary-General to monitor the situation.

The resolution was approved by 14 votes to none against, while the United States abstained from voting.

See also
 Internal resistance to South African apartheid
 List of United Nations Security Council Resolutions 501 to 600 (1982–1987)
 Apartheid

References
Text of the Resolution at undocs.org

External links
 

 0556
1984 in South Africa
 0556
October 1984 events